

By prefecture
 Lists of schools in Tokyo
 List of high schools in Chiba Prefecture
 List of junior high schools in Chiba Prefecture
 List of elementary schools in Chiba Prefecture
 List of junior high schools in Kanagawa Prefecture
 List of elementary schools in Kanagawa Prefecture
 List of junior high schools in Saitama Prefecture
 List of elementary schools in Saitama Prefecture

By municipality
 List of schools in Narita, Chiba
 Tokyo is treated as a prefecture
 List of schools in Adachi, Tokyo
 List of municipal schools in Shinjuku (for Shinjuku City, Tokyo Metropolis)

By type
 List of international schools in Japan
 List of single gender schools in Japan

Official Japanese schools (certified by Japanese Government)

Public high schools

 Fukui Prefectural School for the Blind
 Fukui Prefectural School for the Deaf
 Yokosuka High School
 Fukuoka Prefectural Fukuoka High School
 Inagakuen Public High School
 Uwajima Fishery High School
 Saga Technical High School

Private high schools

 Chiben Gakuen Middle School (Campuses in Nara and Wakayama)
 Fukuoka Daiichi High School
 Friends School
 Horikoshi High School
 Joshibi High School of Art and Design
 Musashi Junior & Senior High School
 Kaisei Academy
 Yamamura Kokusai High School
 Taku Senior High School
 Seien Girls' High School
 Kobe Ryūkoku Junior High School, High School
 Nada High School
 Keio Shonan-Fujisawa Junior & Senior High School
 Kobe College Senior High School

International schools (not certified by Japanese Government)
 American School in Japan
 Canadian Academy
 Christian Academy in Japan
 Columbia International School
 German School Tokyo Yokohama
 International Christian Academy of Nagoya
 International School of Sacred Heart, Tokyo
 KA International School
 KAIS International School
 KIU Academy, Kyotanabe, Kyoto
 Kyoto International School
 Marist Brothers International School
 New International School (Tokyo), Tokyo
 Nishimachi International School, Tokyo 
 Osaka International School
 St. Mary's International School
 Saint Maur International School
 Seisen International School, Tokyo
 Tokyo International School
 Tokyo Korean School
 Tokyo West International School
 Tohoku International School
 Tsukuba International School
 Yokohama International School

See also
 List of schools
 List of high schools in Japan
 List of universities in Japan

References

External links
 List of Elementary and Middle Schools in Japan
Coto Japanese Academy